Lasiosticha is a genus of snout moths. It was described by Edward Meyrick in 1887.

Species
 Lasiosticha antelia (Meyrick, 1885)
 Lasiosticha canilinea (Meyrick, 1879)
 Lasiosticha microcosma Lower, 1893
 Lasiosticha opimella (Meyrick, 1879)
 Lasiosticha thermochroa (Lower, 1896)

References

Phycitini
Pyralidae genera